NHS Employers is an organisation which acts on behalf of NHS trusts in the National Health Service in England and Wales. It was formed in 2004, is part of the NHS Confederation, and negotiates contracts with healthcare staff on behalf of the government.

History
In January 2004 the Department of Health announced the responsibility for negotiating staff terms and conditions was to be devolved by them to the NHS Confederation. In November 2004 NHS Employers was formed, and became the body that negotiates healthcare staff contracts on behalf of the government. They regularly collect and analyse the views of employers.

In September 2014, Danny Mortimer was named Chief Executive of NHS Employers, succeeding Dean Royles.

Initiatives
In 2005, most NHS trusts estimated that around half of their staff were suffering from workplace stress, but less than a third of health service managers that responded were able to say that their trusts had a stress management policy at the time.

In 2012 they launched a Speaking Up Charter, asking NHS trusts to commit to actions that would help staff to raise concerns.

In June 2014 they published statistics highlighting the proportion of women in various sections of the NHS workforce.

See also
Agenda for Change, the grading and pay system for NHS staff, excepting doctors, dentists, apprentices and some senior managers
NHS Pension Scheme

References

External links
 

National Health Service (England)
2004 establishments in England
Government agencies established in 2004